Amphicyllis is a genus of beetles belonging to the family Leiodidae.

The genus was first described by Wilhelm Ferdinand Erichson in 1845.

The species of this genus are found in Europe.

Species:
 Amphicyllis globiformis
 Amphicyllis globus

References

Leiodidae